This is a list of Mexican films released in 2015.

References

External links

List of 2015 box office number-one films in Mexico

2015
Mexican
Film